Thomas Breese (November 4, 1793 – October 11, 1846) was an American naval officer. Best known for his service under Oliver Hazard Perry during the 1813 Battle of Lake Erie, he served in the United States Navy for another 33 years, including as a paymaster for over two decades.

Early life
Thomas Breese was born in Newport, Rhode Island, on November 4, 1793, the son of a British army officer, Major John Breese (1738–1799), and Elizabeth Malbone (1755–1832). His mother was the daughter of Colonel Francis Malbone (1727–1785), one of Newport's wealthiest shipping merchants, and Margaret Saunders (1730–1775). The Malbones lived in an opulent house on Thames Street, which the Colonel had had built in 1760. The British occupied the house during the Revolutionary War. Major Breese was among the officers stationed there. He fell in love with the Malbones' daughter Elizabeth, and, returning to England after the war, resigned his commission and returned to Newport to marry her. He had obtained the position of British vice consul at Newport.

The Breeses had eight children, of whom Thomas was the youngest son. When he was six, his father died. Despite the Malbones' wealth and connections, Thomas Breese was concerned during his early years to help support his mother and siblings.

He first went to work at T & W Wickham Company, a New York-based shipping company. Thomas Wickham, its principal, was originally from Newport and an old friend of the Malbone family. After the Embargo of 1807 gradually bankrupted Wickham's business, Breese was forced to return to Newport.

Newport was a small close-knit seagoing community, with numerous longstanding ties among its families. The Breeses and Wickhams were members of Newport's Trinity Church (Episcopal), as was the family of Breese's future mentor and patron, Oliver Hazard Perry. Both Breese and Perry were baptized at Trinity as young boys. Their lifelong connection was characteristic of the clannishness that was a feature of the early naval service.

Naval career
Breese's longing for a life at sea led him to ask Perry for an appointment as his personal clerk. Perry was in command of a flotilla of ships at Newport RI when the War of 1812 began. Early in 1813, Perry received orders to go to the Great Lakes. Almost 150 sailors from the Newport area, including Thomas Breese, were sent there with him. The sailors made the arduous trip to Presque Isle, Pennsylvania, on the shore of Lake Erie, in February and March 1813.

From March through August of that year, Breese served as Perry's clerk during the time required to build the Lake Erie fleet and prepare it for battle. Breese's signature appears on letters he wrote for Perry, indicating his knowledge of Perry's leadership and management of the endeavor. Perry appointed Breese the fleet's chaplain, which gave him a higher salary and a berth with the officers on board ship. During the ensuing naval battle with the British, Breese served as the commander's aide, along with Perry's younger brother, James Alexander Perry.

The Battle of Lake Erie, sometimes called the Battle of Put-in-Bay, was fought on 10 September 1813. Thomas assisted in firing the last operational gun on the Lawrence before it went down. Many paintings show the other aide, James Alexander Perry, in the boat too.

After the battle, Breese, as chaplain, was responsible for conducting the services for those who had died. Using the rites of the Episcopal Book of Common Prayer, he presided over the September 11 burial of common seamen in Lake Erie. The following day, September 12, the American and British officers were buried together at Put-in-Bay. (Breese was listed as a chaplain in the ship's record, but he served as both chaplain and clerk, which was an official rating of the United States Navy beginning in 1794. Clerks for commanders of naval vessels were termed the captain's clerk.)

Breese received a share of the prize money allotted to the crew; he directed that the money (which amounted to over $1200) be sent to his mother in Newport. Along with other officers, he was also given a medal and a sword for his role.

Breese was subsequently promoted to the rank of purser, thanks to the efforts of Commodore Perry, who sought promotions for all of his crew. To become a purser required serving at least one year as a captain's clerk, helping with the captain's correspondence and records. Between his time with Perry at Newport and the nine months on Lake Erie, Breese had fulfilled this requirement. The purser had charge of the stores and accounts on board ship. Breese was stationed at Boston when his new commission became effective on July 8, 1815.

During the Second Barbary War, Breese served in the Mediterranean under Perry on the frigate .

In Newport on May 25, 1825, Thomas Breese married Lucy Marie Randolph, daughter of Richard K. Randolph. Randolph was a nephew of future president William Henry Harrison. Among the Breeses' children was Kidder Breese, who also became a respected naval officer.

In 1825, Breese was appointed navy paymaster in Newport, a post he held to the end of his career. A drinking song, "Here's a health to thee, Tom Breese," written in 1830 and dedicated to him, became popular among sailors.

Thomas Breese died October 11, 1846, in Cambridge, Massachusetts. He is buried in Island Cemetery in Newport.

Naval assignments
Thomas Breese Naval Assignments
 1812 – Newport frigate Revenge – Clerk to O. H. Perry
 1813 – Battle of Lake Erie – Captain's Clerk / Chaplain / Captain's Aid during Battle
 1814–1817 Frigate  – Captain's Clerk to O. H. Perry
 1918 – Frigate Congress – Purser (p 461 ASP)
 1919 – Frigate Constitution – Purser (pg 594 ASP)
 1820 – Not on duty – Purser (pg 633 ASP)
 1821–1823 Frigate Constitution – Purser (pg 703, 751, 858 ASP)
 1824 – Frigate Constitution – Purser – ship stationed in Mediterranean (pg 922 ASP)
 1825 – Frigate Constitution – Purser – on leave of absence (pg 925 ASP)
 1825–1846 Newport Torpedo Station – Purser – Paymaster

General references

Altoff, Gerard T. (1988). "War of 1812: Leathernecks on Lake Erie," Leatherneck: Magazine of the Marines 71:11 (November).

Mahan, Alfred Thayer(1905) Sea Power in Its Relation to the War of 1812 (2 vols.) (Boston: Little Brown) American Library Association. 

New England Historical & Genealogical Register vol 17(1863): 21–3; contains a verbatim excerpt on Breese/Breeze from Parsons' Brief Sketches cited below.
Niles, John M (1821). The Life of Oliver Hazard Perry. 2d ed. Hartford: O. D. Cooke. (public domain)
Parsons, Usher (1862). Brief Sketches of the Officers Who Were In The Battle Of Lake Erie Albany NY: J. Munsell. Note: Parsons uses a contemporary alternate spelling of Breese's name, referring to him throughout as Thomas Breeze.

Skaggs, David Curtis. (October 2006) Oliver Hazard Perry: honor, courage, and patriotism in the early U.S. Navy. Annapolis, Maryland:Naval Institute Press. ; .
Skaggs, David Curtis, and Gerard T. Altoff (1997). A Signal Victory: The Lake Erie Campaign, 1812–1813 (Naval Institute Press), winner John Lyman Book Awards. .

References 

"Niagara." Pamphlet published by the Flagship Niagara, Erie, Pennsylvania. 1990
The Building of Perry's Fleet on Lake Erie: 1812–1813. By M. Rosenberg. Harrisburg: Pennsylvania Historical and Museum Commission,1997
History of the battle of Lake Erie (September 10, 1813,) and reminiscences of the flagship "Lawrence," by Capt. W. W. Dobbins
Serving Two Masters: The Development of American Military Chaplaincy, 1860–1920. By Richard M. Budd (University of Nebraska Press, 2002)  
The Life of Commodore Oliver Hazard Perry, Volume 1. By Alexander Slidell Mackenzie.
The Military Surgeon: Journal of the Association of Military Volume 51 by Usher Parsons
Cooper, James Fenimore, History of the Navy (1839).
Letter from Thomas Breese to his Mother dated September 12, 1812. (Breese descendants' private collection)

External links 
 Brig Niagara Battle Log
 Brig Niagara Perry's Luck 
 Perry's Victory and International Peace Memorial - National Park 
 Ohio History - The War of 1812 
 Navy Pursers In the War of 1812

1773 births
1846 deaths
People from Newport, Rhode Island
People of colonial Rhode Island
United States Navy officers
Naval history
People from Rhode Island in the War of 1812